The 2011–12 Lega Basket Serie A was the 90th season of the Lega Basket Serie A, the top level basketball league in Italy. The season started on 9 October 2011 and ended on 6 May 2012. Montepaschi Siena initially won the national title. However, in 2016 their championship was revoked after investigations showed financial and fiscal fraud.

Teams

Angelico Biella
Banca Tercas Teramo
Banco di Sardegna Sassari
Benetton Treviso
Bennet Cantù
Canadian Solar Bologna
Cimberio Varese
EA7 Emporio Armani Milano
Fabi Shoes Montegranaro
Montepaschi Siena
Novipiù Casale Monferrato
Pepsi Caserta
Scavolini Siviglia Pesaro
Sidigas Avellino
Umana Venezia
Vanoli-Braga Cremona
Virtus Roma

Regular season

Standings

Playoffs

References

Lega Basket Serie A seasons
1
Italy